BMF may refer to:
 BMF, IATA code for Bakouma Airport in the Central African Republic
 BMF (gene), a gene that encodes the human protein Bcl-2-modifying factor
 BMF (record label), a record label based in Ireland
 Be Military Fit, a UK fitness company (previously called British Military Fitness)
 Bird–Meertens formalism, a calculus for deriving computer programs from specifications by a process of equational reasoning
 Black Mafia Family, a former drug trafficking organization originally based in Detroit, Michigan
 BMF (TV series), a 2021 television series about the Black Mafia Family
 Boston MedFlight, a non-profit medical transport organization in eastern Massachusetts
 Budapesti Műszaki Főiskola (Budapest Technical College), former name of Óbuda University
 British Marine Federation, a UK trade association
 British Motorcyclists Federation 
 British Museum Friends, a registered charitable organisation in the UK
 British Muslim Forum, a Muslim organization representing 500 Mosques across the UK
 Bundesministerium der Finanzen (Federal Ministry of Finance (Germany)), the German Federal Ministry of Finance
 Bundesministerium für Finanzen (The Austrian Ministry of Finance)
 "B.M.F. (Blowin' Money Fast)", a song from Rick Ross's fourth studio album Teflon Don
 Brain Mapping Foundation
 BMF, an abbreviation of bad motherfucker